Hermansen Island Bird Sanctuary is a bird reserve at Svalbard, Norway, established in 1973. It includes Hermansen Island on the west coast of Oscar II Land.

References

Bird sanctuaries in Svalbard
Protected areas established in 1973
1973 establishments in Norway